The following is a list of the songs produced by Sam the Kid.

Production discographies
Production discography
Hip hop discographies